Otto Thott Fritzner Müller (3 December 1864 – 28 December 1944) was a Norwegian schoolteacher and politician. He was born in Trondheim to Carl Arnoldus Müller and Arnoldine von Westen Sylow Kjeldsberg. He was elected representative to the Storting for the periods 1919–1921 and 1922–1924, for the Conservative Party. He served as mayor of Halden 1913–16.

References

1864 births
1944 deaths
Politicians from Trondheim
Norwegian schoolteachers
Mayors of places in Østfold
Conservative Party (Norway) politicians
Members of the Storting